Sweet Nothings is the seventh studio album by Dog Fashion Disco, released in 2014. Their first album in eight years, it was written and recorded after the band reunited in 2013, following an almost seven-year hiatus. It is the first album with Tim Swanson of Ideamen on keyboard. However, he played with the band on the 2006 tour in support for their previous album, Adultery. Todd Smith said about the new album: "It was a love letter to our fans who missed us and grew up listening to DFD".

Background
The reformation of the band was announced at the 2013 reunion in Baltimore, where Todd announced that the band was to reunite and put out a new album the following year. The band officially reunited on October 10, 2013. The band was still signed to the Rotten Records label, but receiving no financial support from the label, the band  started a fundraising campaign on Indiegogo on February 6, 2014. Asking for $30,000, they reached their goal in under 24 hours, and by the time the fundraiser closed on March 18, 2014, the band had raised $85,122. The album was recorded shortly after, and released on July 22, 2014, through Rotten Records. The album's final, untitled track features Todd Smith thanking everyone who contributed to the Indiegogo campaign by name, as well as promising a follow-up album to be recorded in 2015.

Track listing

Personnel
Todd Smith – vocals
Jasan Stepp – guitar
Tim Swanson – keyboards
Brian White – bass 
John Ensminger – drums

References

2014 albums
Dog Fashion Disco albums
Crowdfunded albums